Ormskirk Heelers are an amateur rugby league club from Ormskirk in Lancashire. They play at Green Road , which is also the home of Ormskirk rugby union side. In 2006, Southport Storm merged with the Heelers, but there were no name changes on Ormskirks part. This allowed the club to pull in players from a bigger catchment area. 

In the past few years the club has been in various divisions of the Rugby League Conference, including playing against teams from Cheshire, Merseyside and Lancashire . They currently play in the RLC North West division, after the merging of the Cheshire and the North West divisions.

Seasons

In 2005 whilst playing in the RLC North West Division the Heelers finished 8th on 6 points, winning three of their nine matches.

But in 2006 there was a change in head coach, Dave Archer coming in to try and steer the club to the top of a new challenge in the RLC Cheshire Division . And he had seemed to have done the job with the team losing just two of their ten matches. Despite finishing 2nd though, in the playoffs they didn't do as well ending up 4th after losing both games.

After the merging of the two divisions they had previous participated in, the club were once again playing in the RLC North West division in 2007. The season was a disaster with the Heelers unable to field a side for six of their games, thus finishing bottom place, 12th, losing all their 12 games. In the whole season they had scored just 72 points whilst conceding 354 points. It is still unsure whether Ormskirk Heelers will be playing in 2008.

Results

These are the results from the 2007 season :

 Liverpool Buccaneers 22-12 Ormskirk Heelers
 Ormskirk Heelers 12-20 Widnes Saints
 Blackpool Sea Eagles 52-22 Ormskirk Heelers
 Ormskirk Heelers 0-24 Warrington Wizards
 Ormskirk Heelers 0-24 Macclesfield Titans
 Ormskirk Heelers 0-24 Runcorn RLC
 Ormskirk Heelers 14-32 Liverpool Buccaneers
 Widnes Saints 50-14 Ormskirk Heelers
 Ormskirk Heelers 0-24 Blackpool Sea Eagles
 Warrington Wizards 0-24 Ormskirk Heelers
 Runcorn RLC 24-0 Ormskirk Heelers

Visit To America
In 2006 head coach Mike Featherstone got the team playing a 9 a side match on the North Avenue Beach at Chicago. They played newly formed team the Chicago Saints, who were hoping to get access into the AMNRL in 2007. The match finished a 20-20 draw, both sides scoring 5 tries each .

See also

 Rugby League Conference

External links
 BBC Merseyside Match Report Against Blackpool Sea Eagles
 Rugby League Conference Website

Rugby League Conference teams
Rugby clubs established in 2005
Ormskirk
Rugby league teams in Lancashire
2005 establishments in England
English rugby league teams